Yves Ulysse Jr. (born July 29, 1988) is a Canadian professional boxer. As an amateur, he competed at two editions of the World Championships in 2011 and 2013, both at light welterweight.

Amateur career 
As a teenager, Yves practiced various sports such as basketball, football and taekwondo. Around the age of 17 he heard about Floyd Mayweather Jr. who earned $35 million. When he first heard this he said to himself, "I am fighting in the street for any dollar and he (Floyd) makes 35 million for a fight. I want to make money too." So Yves began to train in Club De Boxe Champions of Montreal.

Yves spent three years on the Canadian national boxing team. He also won two Canadian Amateur Championships in the light welterweight category. He also participated in two world amateur championship tournaments in 2011 and 2013. He lost in the round of 32 at the 2011 tournament  and in the round of 16 at the 2013 tournament. He also reached the quarterfinals at the 2010 Commonwealth Games in Delhi.

Professional career 

In December 2013, the 25-year-old boxer signed his first professional contract when he teamed up with InterBox. His first fight took place on 18 January 2014, when he was beaten on the undercard of the Pascal-Bute fight.

On 5 December 2019, Yves Ulysse Jr. lost to Ismael Barroso in a 12 round decision.

Since his defeat to Barroso, Yves has won four consecutive bouts, three coming by way of Knock-out.

Professional boxing record

References

External links
 

Black Canadian boxers
1988 births
Boxers from Montreal
French Quebecers
Boxers at the 2010 Commonwealth Games
Commonwealth Games competitors for Canada
Canadian male taekwondo practitioners
Living people
Canadian male boxers
Light-welterweight boxers